Bombus sonorus, commonly known as the Sonoran bumble bee, is a species of bumble bee in the family Apidae. It is found in Central America and western and southwestern North America. Considered uncommon, it is sometimes categorized as a subspecies of Bombus pensylvanicus.

Description
The thorax of this bumblebee is predominantly yellow and it has a long tongue. It can be confused with the yellow form of Bombus crotchii and with Bombus nevadensis. It likes to collect pollen from Gossypium, Viguiera, Helianthus, Linaria, Chrysothamnus, and Kallstroemia flowers.

Subspecies
These two subspecies belong to the species Bombus sonorus:
 Bombus sonorus flavodorsalis Franklin
 Bombus sonorus sonorus Say, 1837

References

Further reading

 
 
 

Bumblebees
Articles created by Qbugbot
Insects described in 1837